Ulises Estrella Moya (July 4, 1939 – December 27, 2014) was an Ecuadorian poet. He was the co-founder of Tzantzismo, a movement of the 1960s, Ecuador. He was also a film expert, who headed the film department of the House of Ecuadorian Culture for over 30 years.

Biography
His parents were Nicolás Estrella Maldonado from Tabacundo and Laura Moya Sánchez from Latacunga.

In the beginning of 1963 Estrella met Regina Katz. Together they traveled to Panama, and later to San Jose, Costa Rica where he taught a poetry course for three months to the children of the Castella Conservatory. They also went to Nicaragua, Honduras, Guatemala, and finally to Mexico, because in Argentina Regina had earned a scholarship to study dance at the Instituto Nacional de Bellas Artes. In Mexico he wrote for the poetry magazine "El Corno emplumado", and was a literary critic for the newspapers "Ovaciones" and "Excelsior". They then moved to New York for 9 months, where he spent a great deal of time watching movies by Italian neorealist directors such as Federico Fellini, Luchino Visconti, Michelangelo Antonioni, which sparked his interest in film. He then moved to Colombia, where he socialized with the Nadaists led by Gonzalo Arango. By mid 1964 Estrella returned to Quito.

In 1965 he traveled to Trujillo, then to Lima, and he lived in Cuzco for 2 months among poets and painters, arranging poetry readings and conferences. In 1966 he went to Buenos Aires where he studied Art and Essay Films. He also reunited with Regina who was back in Argentina. In 1966 he and Regina returned to Quito where he presided over the Association of Young Artists and Writers.

In 1967 he represented Ecuador in the International Poets Conference celebrated in Varadero, Havana, called "Encuentro con Rubén Darío". In 1969-1970 he taught an Art History Course in Havana, and another course on Aesthetics at the National Art School of Cuba. That year he published a theater piece called "Apenas de este mundo", which was dialectical, folk, and political. Between 1971-1979 he founded the Film Department of the Central University, he also taught Film journalism and Image Theory at the School of Information Science at the Central University.

Between 1974-1984 he directed the newspaper "Prensa Obrera" of the Federation of Workers of Pichincha. In 1975 he was elected vice president of the Federation of Employees and Workers of the Central University, and Permanent Secretary of the National Federation of Employees and Workers of Ecuador (CTE).

Tzantzismo
In 1962, Estrella and the Argentine poet Leandro Katz co-authored a poetry book titled "Clamor", which marked the birth of Tzantzismo. Its members, called Tzántzicos, wore long, unkempt beards, as a symbolic tribute to Fidel Castro, and also grew their hair long and wore jeans. They began gathering at the home of the painter Eliza Aliz (birth name Elizabeth Rumazo) and her husband the Cuban painter Rene Aliz. Later the Tzántzicos would meet on Friday nights at the Café Aguila de Oro, which they renamed "77 Café", to have discussions on poetry, politics and other cultural matters. The first Tzántzico Manifesto was signed on August 27, 1962 by Marco Muñoz, Alfonso Murriagui, Simón Corral, Teodoro Murillo, Euler Granda and Ulises Estrella.

Film
Between 1967 and 1970 he was the founding director of the University Film Club. He also taught literature at the Theater School of the House of Ecuadorian Culture, and the Favio Paccioni Art Center at the Central University of Ecuador.

In 1976 he produced the black and white movie "Fuera de Aquí" with the Kamán group of Bolivia, directed by Jorge Sanginés. The film received a prize at the Tashken Festival, in the Uzbekistan Republic, in the Soviet Union. Then in 1980 he again joined the House of Ecuadorian Culture and founded its Film section. He also produced a documentary titled "Cartas al Ecuador" based on a book by Benjamín Carrión.

With the help of UNESCO he was able to carry out a project called Rescue and Salvage of Ecuadorian moving images. Among the recuperated material there are 95 Ecuadorian movies with a total of 42 hours and twenty minutes of film in 9.5 mm, which was transferred to 35 mm thanks to the collaboration of the Cinemateca Brasileña, to avoid its destruction. The majority of the movies were documentaries, and the rest fiction. Some were filmed between 1929-1959, and the majority after 1960.

In 1990 he was elected President of the Association of Employees and Workers of the House of Ecuadorian Culture, and began to write film criticism for the newspaper Hoy. Estrella was the head of the Cultural Film Club (1964), University (1967–1970) and city of Quito, (1979). He created the Film Department at the Central University (1971), the Cinemateca (1982), focusing on three aspects archiving, diffusion, and education.

Personal life
In 1963 Ulises Estrella met Regina Katz. In 1969 they had a daughter named Isadora Estrella Katz. From 1980 until his death he lived with the film director Mónica Vásquez Baquero. He died on December 27, 2014.

Poetry books
 Clamor (1962) co-authored with Alejandro Katz
 Ombligo del Mundo (1966)
 Apenas de este mundo (1967)
 Convulsionario (1974)
 Aguja que rompe el tiempo (1980)
 Fuera del Juego (1983) winner of the Jorge Carrera Andrade Prize, Quito
 Sesenta Poemas (1984)
 Interiores (1986)
 Cuando el sol se mira de frente (1989)

References 

1939 births
2014 deaths
Ecuadorian male poets
20th-century Ecuadorian poets
Academic staff of the Central University of Ecuador
20th-century male writers